Highway 210 is a provincial highway in the Canadian province of Saskatchewan. It runs from Highway 10 to Highway 35 in Fort Qu'Appelle.

Highway 210 intersects Highway 56 and also passes through the Echo Valley Provincial Park, B-Say-Tah, and provides access to Pasqua and Echo Lakes of the Fishing Lakes.

Major intersections
From south to north:

Photo gallery

See also
Roads in Saskatchewan

References

210